Bensu Soral (born 23 March 1991) is a Turkish actress.

Life and career
She studied at İnegöl Anatolian High School in Bursa. She is still studying graphic at Marmara University Faculty of Fine Arts. She started acting career by the support of her sister Hande Soral who is an actress. For the first time she appeared on television screen with period series Yol Ayrımı based from classic novel   with Engin Altan Düzyatan.

She played in youth series "Boynu Bükükler" alongside Çağlar Ertuğrul, Öznur Serçeler. In 2015, she acted alongside Şükrü Özyıldız, Dilan Çiçek Deniz, Büşra Develi, Alperen Duymaz, Beste Kökdemir, Burak Deniz and Melisa Şenolsun in the TV series Tatlı Küçük Yalancılar adaptation of 'Pretty Little Liars'. Later in 2016, she played the role of Melek in crime series İçerde opposite to Çağatay Ulusoy.

In 2018 she made her film debut in   franchise comedy Organize İşler 2: Sazan Sarmalı alongside Kıvanç Tatlıtuğ, Ezgi Mola and Yılmaz Erdoğan. She is set to play a leading role in the Iranian-Turkish film Mest-i Aşk alongside İbrahim Çelikkol, Selma Ergeç, Shahab Hosseini, Parsa Pirouzfar, Hande Erçel and Boran Kuzum.

Filmography

Awards

References 

1991 births
Living people
People from Bursa
Turkish film actresses
Turkish television actresses
21st-century Turkish actresses